Dalmau is a surname and may refer to:

Albert Dalmau (born 1992), Spanish footballer
Christian Dalmau (born 1975), Puerto Rican basketball player
Custo Dalmau (born 1959), Catalan fashion designer
Gastón Dalmau (born 1983), Argentine actor and singer
Jordi Dalmau (born 1989), Spanish motorcycle racer
José Luis Dalmau (born 1966), Puerto Rican politician
Juan Dalmau Ramírez (born 1973), Puerto Rican lawyer and politician
Lluís Dalmau, Catalan painter of the 15th century
Martín Dalmau, (born  1974) Argentine politician
Raymond Dalmau (born 1950), Puerto Rican basketball player
Ricardo Dalmau (born 1977), Puerto Rican basketball player
Richie Dalmau (born 1973), Puerto Rican basketball player

Catalan-language surnames